Ali Al-Dhanhani (Arabic:علي الظنحاني; born 1 June 1991) is an Emirati footballer. He currently plays as a right back for Khor Fakkan on loan from Al-Sharjah.

References

External links
 

Emirati footballers
1991 births
Living people
Dibba FC players
Sharjah FC players
Khor Fakkan Sports Club players
Place of birth missing (living people)
UAE First Division League players
UAE Pro League players
Association football fullbacks